Regional theatre  may refer to:

 Community theatre
 Regional theater in the United States